Robert Bobin (2 August 1920 – 11 February 1994) was a French athlete. He competed in the men's triple jump at the 1948 Summer Olympics.

References

External links
 

1920 births
1994 deaths
Athletes (track and field) at the 1948 Summer Olympics
French male triple jumpers
Olympic athletes of France
Place of birth missing
20th-century French people